The Great American Stakes is a discontinued American Thoroughbred horse race last run annually at Belmont Park in Elmont, New York. Raced on dirt and open to two-year-old horses only, it was last run at a distance of five and a half furlongs.

Historical notes
The race was inaugurated as a five furlong event at the Gravesend Race Track at Gravesend on Coney Island, New York.  Passage off the Hart–Agnew Law that banned parimutuel betting. Enacted by the Republican controlled New York Legislature under Governor Charles Evans Hughes, left owners of Gravesend Race Track and other racing facilities in New York State struggling to stay in business without income from betting. Further restrictive legislation was passed by the New York Legislature in 1910 which deepened the financial crisis for track operators and led to a complete shut down of racing across the state during 1911 and 1912.
 When a February 21, 1913 ruling by the New York Supreme Court, Appellate Division saw horse racing return in 1913, the Great American Stakes was revived and over the years would be hosted by three different New York racetracks. While at Aqueduct Racetrack, the Great American Stakes earned Grade 3 status in 1973 and 1974.

Success and failure of some Hall of Fame greats
While at Gravesend, the Great American Stakes attracted many of the top two-year-olds of the day including 1893 winner and future U.S. Racing Hall of Fame inductee Domino.

Over the years there were a number of upsets in the running of the Great American Stakes. In 1936, Fairy Hill defeated War Admiral and in 1977, in what became one of the great rivalries in the history of American racing, Alydar easily beat Affirmed.

Chronology of racetracks:
 Gravesend Race Track (1889–1910)
 Belmont Park (1913, 1957, 1975–1982)
 Aqueduct Racetrack (1914–1955, 1960–1974)
 Jamaica Race Course (1956, 1958–1959)

Records
Speed record:
 5 furlongs: 1:00.20 – Snark (1935)
 5½ furlongs:  1:03.80 – Laus' Cause (1982) 
 6 furlongs: 1:12.00 – Getthere Jack (1955)

Most wins by a jockey:
 5- Eddie Arcaro (1937, 1941, 1949, 1956, 1958)

Most wins by a trainer:
 4 – James G. Rowe Sr. (1889, 1902, 1921, 1926)
 4 – James E. Fitzsimmons (1927, 1933, 1934, 1935)

Most wins by an owner:
 4- Wheatley Stable (1927, 1933, 1934, 1935)
 4- Harry Payne Whitney (1905, 1921, 1922, 1926)

Winners

External links
  Video at YouTube of the 1977 Great American Stakes – Alydar vs Affirmed

References

Discontinued horse races in New York (state)
Flat horse races for two-year-olds
Belmont Park
Gravesend Race Track
Recurring sporting events established in 1889
Recurring events disestablished in 1982
1889 establishments in New York (state)
1982 disestablishments in New York (state)